Davenport Apartments is a historic apartment building located at Greenville, South Carolina. It was built in 1915–1916, and is a three-story, "U"-shaped, brick building.  It consists of a large rectangular section in the rear with two smaller wings that extend from the rear block to the street.  The front façade features two one-story porches with stone elliptical arches and brick pillars.

It was added to the National Register of Historic Places in 1982.

References

Residential buildings on the National Register of Historic Places in South Carolina
Residential buildings completed in 1916
National Register of Historic Places in Greenville, South Carolina